Pancrase: King of Pancrase Tournament Second Round was a mixed martial arts event held by Pancrase Hybrid Wrestling. It took place at Sumo Hall in Tokyo, Japan on December 17, 1994. The event continued the 2 day, 16 man tournament to crown the first ever champion of Pancrase and featured the Semifinals and Finals of the tournament.

Previously, Masakatsu Funaki, Ken Shamrock, Manabu Yamada and Minoru Suzuki had survived Day 1 at the King of Pancrase Opening Round and advanced to Day 2.

Background
Funaki and Shamrock had fought twice previously, with Shamrock winning once and Funaki winning once. It was also an example of student vs. teacher as Funaki was Shamrock's trainer and mentor and cornered Shamrock for his UFC fights in America.

In addition to the Semifinals and Finals of the tournament, the card also included two alternate bouts matching Katsuomi Inagaki vs. Gregory Smit and Scott Bessac vs. Larry Papadopoulos.

Results

King of Pancrase Tournament bracket

See also 
 Pancrase
 List of Pancrase champions
 List of Pancrase events
 1994 in Pancrase

References

External links
 Official Pancrase Website
 Sherdog.com event results

1994 in mixed martial arts
Mixed martial arts in Japan
Sports competitions in Tokyo
1994 in Japanese sport
Pancrase events